Tarabya II of Sagaing (1327–1352) was king of Sagaing from 1349 to 1352. He reestablished peace with Sagaing's rival Pinya.

Brief
Tarabya the younger was the youngest child of Queen Saw Hnaung and King Saw Yun of Sagaing. He was born eight months after his father's death. His half-uncle Tarabya I succeeded the throne, and made his mother the chief queen. The younger Tarabya grew up at the Sagaing Palace until he was about eight. In 1335/36, he and his three full siblings had to flee to Mindon, deep inside Pinya's territory after their half-cousin Shwetaungtet overthrew Tarabya I. The siblings spent the next three years in exile with the help of their mother and her ally Chief Minister Nanda Pakyan until their cover was blown and brought back to Sagaing in 1339. But after a palace battle between loyalists of Shwetaungtet and Tarabya I killed both Shwetaungtet and Tarabya, the eldest brother Kyaswa was placed on the throne by Nanda Pakyan.

Tarabya like his middle brother Minye played no more than a nominal role in Kyaswa's reign (1339−49) since Nanda Pakyan actually ran the country. Nevertheless, he became king in late 1349 after Kyaswa and Minye died within eight months that year. He inherited Minye's white elephant, and proclaimed himself Hsinbyushin ("Lord of the White Elephant").

Tarabya II's reign lasted just over two years. He pursued a guarded policy towards Sagaing's traditional rival Pinya. In 1351, he gave sanctuary to Gov. Saw Ke of Yamethin, who fled from King Kyawswa II of Pinya. This followed Minye's giving sanctuary to Gov. Nawrahta of Pinle in 1349. But Tarabya tried to cool the situation by sending his sister Princess Soe Min and her husband Gov. Thado Hsinhtein of Tagaung to seek a truce with Kyawswa II. The embassy was successful, and the peace between the two Central Burmese kingdoms was maintained. He died soon after, and was succeeded by Soe Min's second husband Thihapate on 23 February 1352.

Chronicle reporting differences
The royal chronicles do not agree on his birth and death dates.

Ancestry

Notes

References

Bibliography
 
 
 
 
 

Myinsaing dynasty
Sagaing dynasty
1352 deaths
1327 births
14th-century Burmese monarchs